Kanadai Magyar Hokiklub SE is a men's ice hockey team playing in the Slovak 2. Liga, and formed in 2006. They play in the city of Budapest, Hungary at Tüske Hall Budapest.

References

External links
Official web site (Hungarian)
 

Sport in Budapest
Ice hockey teams in Hungary
2006 establishments in Hungary